Cabezas Rubias is a town and municipality located in the province of Huelva, Spain. According to the 2005 census, it has a population of 873 inhabitants and covers a 109 km2 area (8 inhabitants/km2 population density).

Demographics

References

External links
Cabezas Rubias - Sistema de Información Multiterritorial de Andalucía

Municipalities in the Province of Huelva